Nice to Meet You may refer to:

Music

Albums
 Nice to Meet You (Seeb EP), 2018
 Nice to Meet You (Acoustic Live Solo), an EP by Francesca Michielin, 2016
 Nice to Meet You, by Allen McKenzie, 2000

Songs
 "Nice to Meet You"  (song), by Forever the Sickest Kids, 2013
 "Nice to Meet You", by Dean Geyer, 2006
 "Nice to Meet You", by G.NA from Black & White, 2011
 "Nice to Meet You", by Vigiland, 2018
 "Nice to Meet You!!", from the anime series Ojamajo Doremi; see Ojamajo Doremi discography

Concerts
 Nice to Meet You (concert), a one-off concert by Yoasobi, 2021

Manga
 "Nice to Meet You!", chapter 191 of Kuroko's Basketball; see List of Kuroko's Basketball chapters
 "Nice to Meet You", volume 10 and chapter 88 of Medaka Box; see List of Medaka Box chapters

See also
 
 Greeting
 Nice to Meet Ya (disambiguation)